The Embassy is a visual effects studio located in Vancouver, British Columbia, Canada. The Embassy is known for its photo-realistic visual effects work on commercials and more recently, features.
The studio completed a number of visual effects shots for Marvel Studios, Iron Man and more recently contributed effects to the climactic sequence of the Peter Jackson produced film, District 9.<ref>[https://vancouversun.com/entertainment/movie-guide/Vancouver+visual+effects+studios+manufacture+District+alien+look/1846650/story.html "Vancouver visual effects studios manufacture District 9'''s alien look"]</ref> The Embassy's visual effects work on District 9'' was nominated for an Academy Award.

The Embassy is most famous for a series of commercials created for French automobile maker, Citroën. The commercials feature a computer generated car which transforms into a robot. The visual effects created for the first Citroën commercial were the subject of a promotional campaign by Apple Inc., promoting the use of its compositing software, Shake.

The Embassy has also worked on advertising campaigns for Nike, Mercedes-Benz, Chevrolet and GMC.

References

External links

Visual effects companies
Canadian animation studios
Computer animation
Companies based in Vancouver